Min Min Oo is a Burmese politician and electrical engineer who served as Chief Minister of Mon State from 30 March 2016 to 23 February 2017.

Early life 
He was a student leader during the 1988 student uprising. He is the vice chair of the NLD office in Bilin Township, where he won a seat in the state parliament. He is also head of finance for Bilin Township's rubber plantation association, and a member of Taungzone Hospital's administrative committee.

Chief Minister 
The president, Htin Kyaw let him to drop out on February 23, 2017.

References 

Living people
National League for Democracy politicians
People from Mon State
Government ministers of Myanmar
Year of birth missing (living people)